David Anthony Bavaro (born March 27, 1967) is a former American football player. A linebacker at Syracuse University, Bavaro played professionally in the National Football League (NFL) for the Phoenix Cardinals (1990), the Buffalo Bills (1991), the Minnesota Vikings (1992), and the New England Patriots (1993–1994). His brother Mark Bavaro also played in the NFL. He now teaches physical education at Malden Catholic High School.

1967 births
Living people
People from Danvers, Massachusetts
Sportspeople from Essex County, Massachusetts
Players of American football from Massachusetts
American football linebackers
Syracuse Orange football players
Phoenix Cardinals players
Buffalo Bills players
Minnesota Vikings players
New England Patriots players